The Pakistani Taliban is an umbrella organization of various Islamist armed militant groups operating along the Afghan–Pakistani border.

Pakistani Taliban may also refer to:
Pakistani members of the Taliban
Jamaat-ul-Ahrar, a group that split and rejoined the Tehrik-i-Taliban
Tehreek-e-Nafaz-e-Shariat-e-Mohammadi